Chimoré River is a river in the departments of Cochabamba and Santa Cruz in Bolivia.

References

Rivers of Cochabamba Department
Rivers of Santa Cruz Department (Bolivia)